Nikola Mitrović (born 2 January 1987) is a Serbian professional footballer who plays as a defensive midfielder for Hungarian club Budapest Honvéd.

Club career

Early years
In 1997, aged 10, Mitrović joined the youth system of his hometown club Napredak Kruševac. He was promoted to the senior squad in 2004. Over the next three seasons, Mitrović amassed over 100 competitive appearances for the side, as they were promoted to the top flight in 2007.

Partizan
On 23 July 2007, Mitrović agreed to a three-year contract with Partizan. He served mainly as a backup to Brazilian defensive midfielder Juca throughout the season, making 18 appearances (league and cup), as the club won the double. Due to strong competition in his position, Mitrović was loaned to his parent club Napredak Kruševac in the 2008 summer transfer window. He was transferred to Russian club Volga Nizhny Novgorod six months later, spending the entire year there, before again returning to Napredak Kruševac in early 2010.

Újpest and Videoton
In the summer of 2010, Mitrović moved abroad for the second time and joined Hungarian club Újpest. He missed just one out of 30 league games, managing to score once in a 6–0 victory over Újpest's fierce rivals Ferencváros. On 28 June 2011, Mitrović joined Hungarian champions Videoton, signing a two-year contract. He was a regular in his debut season at the club, helping them win the League Cup. In the next 2012–13 campaign, Mitrović collected 50 appearances and netted nine goals in all competitions, both career-highs.

Maccabi Tel Aviv

On 4 August 2013, Mitrović moved to Israeli champions Maccabi Tel Aviv on a one-year deal with an extension option. He was signed by his former Videoton manager Paulo Sousa who joined the club earlier that summer. After defending the league title with Maccabi in his debut season, Mitrović helped the side win the domestic treble in the following 2014–15 campaign. He subsequently made his UEFA Champions League debut in 2015–16, collecting four appearances in the group stage under his countryman Slaviša Jokanović. On 10 January 2016, it was announced that Mitrović would be leaving the club upon his request.

Later years
Just a few days following his departure from Maccabi, Mitrović joined China League One club Shanghai Shenxin. He stayed in Asia for only six months, before returning to Israel and signing for Bnei Yehuda in late August 2016. In January of the following year, Mitrović moved to Cypriot club Anorthosis.

In September 2017, Mitrović returned to his homeland and joined his parent club Napredak Kruševac on a free transfer. He scored the winning goal in a 1–0 home league win over Red Star Belgrade on 1 October 2017, chipping the ball from outside the box over Milan Borjan in the sixth minute of injury time.

In January 2018, Mitrović moved to Poland and joined Ekstraklasa club Wisła Kraków for six months.

In August 2018, Mitrović signed a one-year contract with Azerbaijani club Keşlə.

In July 2019, Mitrović returned to Hungary after six years and signed with Zalaegerszeg.

International career
In April 2010, Mitrović made his full international debut for Serbia, coming on as a substitute for Ljubomir Fejsa in a friendly against Japan, an eventual 3–0 success.

Statistics

Club

International

Honours
Partizan
 Serbian SuperLiga: 2007–08
 Serbian Cup: 2007–08
Videoton
 Ligakupa: 2011–12
 Szuperkupa: 2011, 2012
Maccabi Tel Aviv
 Israeli Premier League: 2013–14, 2014–15
 Israel State Cup: 2014–15
 Toto Cup: 2014–15

Notes

References

External links

 
 
 
 
 

Anorthosis Famagusta F.C. players
Association football midfielders
Azerbaijan Premier League players
Bnei Yehuda Tel Aviv F.C. players
Budapest Honvéd FC players
China League One players
Cypriot First Division players
Ekstraklasa players
Expatriate footballers in Azerbaijan
Expatriate footballers in China
Expatriate footballers in Hungary
Expatriate footballers in Israel
Expatriate footballers in Poland
Expatriate footballers in Russia
FC Volga Nizhny Novgorod players
FK Napredak Kruševac players
FK Partizan players
Israeli Premier League players
Shamakhi FK players
Maccabi Tel Aviv F.C. players
Fehérvár FC players
Nemzeti Bajnokság I players
Serbia and Montenegro footballers
Serbia international footballers
Serbian expatriate footballers
Serbian expatriate sportspeople in Azerbaijan
Serbian expatriate sportspeople in China
Serbian expatriate sportspeople in Hungary
Serbian expatriate sportspeople in Israel
Serbian expatriate sportspeople in Poland
Serbian expatriate sportspeople in Russia
Serbian First League players
Serbian footballers
Serbian SuperLiga players
Shanghai Shenxin F.C. players
Sportspeople from Kruševac
Újpest FC players
Wisła Kraków players
Zalaegerszegi TE players
1987 births
Living people